The 2003 Australian Carrera Cup Championship was a CAMS sanctioned national motor racing championship open to Porsche 911 GT3 Cup Type 996 cars complying with Australian Carrera Cup regulations. The championship, which was administered by CupCar Australia Pty Ltd, was the inaugural Australian Carrera Cup Championship.

Calendar
The championship was contested over a nine-round series with three races per round.

Points system
Championship points were awarded at each race on the following basis:

Championship results

 Note: * indicates points total has been amended due to a minor summation error in the referenced official results.
 Note: ** indicates championship position has been adjusted to fit amended points totals.

References

External links
2003 Australian Carrera Cup Championship images at www.cupcar.com.au

Australian Carrera Cup Championship seasons
Carrera Cup Championship